The 2000 Arizona Diamondbacks looked to improve on their 1999 season, in which they won 100 games in just their 2nd season. They looked to contend in what was a strong National League West Division. They finished the season with a record of 85–77, good enough for third place in the division.

Offseason
 November 15, 1999: Ken Huckaby was signed as a free agent with the Arizona Diamondbacks.
 November 22, 1999: Ernie Young was released by the Arizona Diamondbacks.
 December 15, 1999: Dante Powell was traded by the Arizona Diamondbacks to the St. Louis Cardinals for Luis Ordaz.
 March 20, 2000: Craig Counsell was signed as a free agent with the Arizona Diamondbacks.

Regular season
Randy Johnson tied a modern record with six victories in April 2000. He would lead the league in strikeouts with 347 and in winning percentage (.731). Johnson won his third Cy Young Award, and became the third National League pitcher to win the trophy in consecutive seasons. Johnson recorded his 3000th strikeout on September 10, 2000, as he whiffed Florida Marlins' third baseman Mike Lowell.

Opening Day starters
 Jay Bell
 Erubiel Durazo
 Steve Finley
 Luis Gonzalez
 Lenny Harris
 Randy Johnson
 Travis Lee
 Damian Miller
 Tony Womack

Notable transactions
 June 2, 2000: Bill Pulsipher was traded by the New York Mets to the Arizona Diamondbacks for Lenny Harris.
 June 5, 2000: Brandon Webb was drafted by the Arizona Diamondbacks in the 8th round of the 2000 amateur draft. Player signed June 6, 2000.
 July 26, 2000: Curt Schilling was traded by the Philadelphia Phillies to the Arizona Diamondbacks for Omar Daal, Nelson Figueroa, Travis Lee, and Vicente Padilla.

Season standings

Record vs. opponents

Game log

|-  style="text-align:center; background:#bfb;"
| 1 || April 4 || Phillies || 6–4 || Johnson || Ashby || Holmes (1) || Bank One Ballpark || 44,298 || 1–0 || Philadelphia Phillies at Arizona Diamondbacks Box Score, April 4, 2000
|-  style="text-align:center; background:#bfb;"
| 2 || April 5 || Phillies || 11–3 || Stottlemyre || Byrd || Morgan (1) || Bank One Ballpark || 29,291 || 2–0 || Philadelphia Phillies at Arizona Diamondbacks Box Score, April 5, 2000
|-  style="text-align:center; background:#bfb;"
| 3 || April 6 || Phillies || 3–2 (11 inn.) || Springer || Schrenk || None || Bank One Ballpark || 28,774 || 3–0 || Philadelphia Phillies at Arizona Diamondbacks Box Score, April 5, 2000
|-  style="text-align:center; background:#fbb;"
| 4 || April 7 || Pirates || 2–7 || Christiansen || Reynoso || None || Bank One Ballpark || 32,536 || 3–1 || Pittsburgh Pirates at Arizona Diamondbacks Box Score, April 7, 2000
|-  style="text-align:center; background:#bfb;"
| 5 || April 8 || Pirates || 6–5 || Swindell || Christiansen || None || Bank One Ballpark || 33,298 || 4–1 || Pittsburgh Pirates at Arizona Diamondbacks Box Score, April 8, 2000
|-  style="text-align:center; background:#bfb;"
| 6 || April 9 || Pirates || 1–0 || Johnson || Schmidt || None || Bank One Ballpark || 34,204 || 5–1 || Pittsburgh Pirates at Arizona Diamondbacks Box Score, April 9, 2000
|-  style="text-align:center; background:#bfb;"
| 7 || April 10 || @ Padres || 8–4 || Stottlemyre || Williams || Morgan (2) || Qualcomm Stadium || 60,021 || 6–1 || Arizona Diamondbacks at San Diego Padres Box Score, April 10, 2000
|-  style="text-align:center; background:#fbb;"
| 8 || April 11 || @ Padres || 2–3 (13 inn.) || Whisenant || Springer || None || Qualcomm Stadium || 19,035 || 6–2 || Arizona Diamondbacks at San Diego Padres Box Score, April 11, 2000
|-  style="text-align:center; background:#fbb;"
| 9 || April 12 || @ Padres || 2–4 || Meadows || Reynoso || Hoffman (1) || Qualcomm Stadium || 15,801 || 6–3 || Arizona Diamondbacks at San Diego Padres Box Score, April 12, 2000
|-  style="text-align:center; background:#bfb;"
| 10 || April 13 || @ Padres || 5–4 || Anderson || Hitchcock || Morgan (3) || Qualcomm Stadium || 28,131 || 7–3 || Arizona Diamondbacks at San Diego Padres Box Score, April 13, 2000
|-  style="text-align:center; background:#bfb;"
| 11 || April 14 || @ Giants || 3–1 || Johnson || Hernandez || None || Pacific Bell Park || 40,930 || 8–3 || Arizona Diamondbacks at San Francisco Giants Box Score, April 14, 2000
|-  style="text-align:center; background:#bfb;"
| 12 || April 15 || @ Giants || 7–4 || Stottlemyre || Ortiz || Swindell (1) || Pacific Bell Park || 40,930 || 9–3 || Arizona Diamondbacks at San Francisco Giants Box Score, April 15, 2000
|-  style="text-align:center; background:#fbb;"
| 13 || April 17 || Rockies || 1–9 || Yoshii || Daal || None || Bank One Ballpark || 33,743 || 9–4 || Colorado Rockies at Arizona Diamondbacks Box Score, April 17, 2000
|-  style="text-align:center; background:#bfb;"
| 14 || April 18 || Rockies || 7–1 || Reynoso || Karl || None || Bank One Ballpark || 30,275 || 10–4 || Colorado Rockies at Arizona Diamondbacks Box Score, April 18, 2000
|-  style="text-align:center; background:#bfb;"
| 15 || April 19 || Rockies || 8–7 || Morgan || Tavarez || Kim (1) || Bank One Ballpark || 31,237 || 11–4 || Colorado Rockies at Arizona Diamondbacks Box Score, April 19, 2000
|-  style="text-align:center; background:#bfb;"
| 16 || April 20 || Rockies || 3–0 || Johnson || Arrojo || None || Bank One Ballpark || 34,458 || 12–4 || Colorado Rockies at Arizona Diamondbacks Box Score, April 20, 2000
|-  style="text-align:center; background:#fbb;"
| 17 || April 21 || Giants || 5–11 || Ortiz || Stottlemyre || None || Bank One Ballpark || 40,929 || 12–5 || San Francisco Giants at Arizona Diamondbacks Box Score, April 21, 2000
|-  style="text-align:center; background:#fbb;"
| 18 || April 22 || Giants || 6–8 || Rueter || Daal || Nen (3) || Bank One Ballpark || 45,659 || 12–6 || San Francisco Giants at Arizona Diamondbacks Box Score, April 22, 2000
|-  style="text-align:center; background:#fbb;"
| 19 || April 23 || Giants || 7–12 || Nathan || Reynoso || None || Bank One Ballpark || 35,879 || 12–7 || San Francisco Giants at Arizona Diamondbacks Box Score, April 23, 2000
|-  style="text-align:center; background:#bfb;"
| 20 || April 25 || @ Phillies || 10–2 || Johnson || Brock || None || Veterans Stadium || 11,926 || 13–7 || Arizona Diamondbacks at Philadelphia Phillies Box Score, April 25, 2000
|-  style="text-align:center; background:#bfb;"
| 21 || April 26 || @ Phillies || 10–4 || Stottlemyre || Ashby || None || Veterans Stadium || 12,250 || 14–7 || Arizona Diamondbacks at Philadelphia Phillies Box Score, April 26, 2000
|-  style="text-align:center; background:#fbb;"
| 22 || April 27 || @ Phillies || 4–5 || Gomes || Kim || None || Veterans Stadium || 13,560 || 14–8 || Arizona Diamondbacks at Philadelphia Phillies Box Score, April 27, 2000
|-  style="text-align:center; background:#fbb;"
| 23 || April 28 || @ Cubs || 5–6 || Tapani || Springer || Aguilera (5) || Wrigley Field || 27,507 || 14–9 || Arizona Diamondbacks at Chicago Cubs Box Score, April 28, 2000
|-  style="text-align:center; background:#bfb;"
| 24 || April 29 || @ Cubs || 7–4 (10 inn.) || Mantei || Guthrie || Morgan (4) || Wrigley Field || 37,484 || 15–9 || Arizona Diamondbacks at Chicago Cubs Box Score, April 29, 2000
|-  style="text-align:center; background:#bfb;"
| 25 || April 30 || @ Cubs || 6–0 || Johnson || Lorraine || None || Wrigley Field || 37,274 || 16–9 || Arizona Diamondbacks at Chicago Cubs Box Score, April 30, 2000
|-

|-  style="text-align:center; background:#bfb;"
| 26 || May 2 || @ Brewers || 5–1 || Stottlemyre || Haynes || None || Milwaukee County Stadium || 8,281 || 17–9 || Arizona Diamondbacks at Milwaukee Brewers Box Score, May 2, 2000
|-  style="text-align:center; background:#fbb;"
| 27 || May 3 || @ Brewers || 1–4 || Estrada || Daal || Wickman (4) || Milwaukee County Stadium || 9,600 || 17–10 || Arizona Diamondbacks at Milwaukee Brewers Box Score, May 3, 2000
|-  style="text-align:center; background:#bfb;"
| 28 || May 4 || @ Brewers || 6–2 || Reynoso || Stull || Kim (2) || Milwaukee County Stadium || 8,401 || 18–10 || Arizona Diamondbacks at Milwaukee Brewers Box Score, May 4, 2000
|-  style="text-align:center; background:#bfb;"
| 29 || May 5 || Padres || 5–3 || Johnson || Hitchcock || None || Bank One Ballpark || 42,297 || 19–10 || San Diego Padres at Arizona Diamondbacks Box Score, May 5, 2000
|-  style="text-align:center; background:#bfb;"
| 30 || May 6 || Padres || 10–5 || Anderson || Lopez || None || Bank One Ballpark || 36,827 || 20–10 || San Diego Padres at Arizona Diamondbacks Box Score, May 6, 2000
|-  style="text-align:center; background:#bfb;"
| 31 || May 7 || Padres || 8–1 || Stottlemyre || Clement || None || Bank One Ballpark || 38,060 || 21–10 || San Diego Padres at Arizona Diamondbacks Box Score, May 7, 2000
|-  style="text-align:center; background:#bfb;"
| 32 || May 8 || Dodgers || 15–7 || Daal || Park || None || Bank One Ballpark || 33,338 || 22–10 || Los Angeles Dodgers at Arizona Diamondbacks Box Score, May 8, 2000
|-  style="text-align:center; background:#bfb;"
| 33 || May 9 || Dodgers || 11–7 (12 inn.) || Padilla || Hershiser || None || Bank One Ballpark || 32,326 || 23–10 || Los Angeles Dodgers at Arizona Diamondbacks Box Score, May 9, 2000
|-  style="text-align:center; background:#bfb;"
| 34 || May 10 || Dodgers || 2–1 || Kim || Adams || None || Bank One Ballpark || 43,345 || 24–10 || Los Angeles Dodgers at Arizona Diamondbacks Box Score, May 10, 2000
|-  style="text-align:center; background:#bfb;"
| 35 || May 12 || @ Padres || 6–4 || Anderson || Clement || Kim (3) || Qualcomm Stadium || 24,391 || 25–10 || Arizona Diamondbacks at San Diego Padres Box Score, May 12, 2000
|-  style="text-align:center; background:#bfb;"
| 36 || May 13 || @ Padres || 6–2 || Stottlemyre || Spencer || Morgan (5) || Qualcomm Stadium || 44,044 || 26–10 || Arizona Diamondbacks at San Diego Padres Box Score, May 13, 2000
|-  style="text-align:center; background:#fbb;"
| 37 || May 14 || @ Padres || 1–3 || Meadows || Daal || Hoffman (6) || Qualcomm Stadium || 31,555 || 26–11 || San Diego Padres at Arizona Diamondbacks Box Score, May 7, 2000
|-  style="text-align:center; background:#fbb;"
| 38 || May 16 || @ Expos || 0–2 || Vazquez || Johnson || Hermanson (2) || Olympic Stadium || 11,898 || 26–12 || Arizona Diamondbacks at Montreal Expos Box Score, May 16, 2000
|-  style="text-align:center; background:#fbb;"
| 39 || May 17 || @ Expos || 2–10 || Pavano || Reynoso || None || Olympic Stadium || 8,766 || 26–13 || Arizona Diamondbacks at Montreal Expos Box Score, May 17, 2000
|-  style="text-align:center; background:#bfb;"
| 40 || May 18 || @ Expos || 8–6 || Kim || Telford || None || Olympic Stadium || 11,073 || 27–13 || San Diego Padres at Arizona Diamondbacks Box Score, May 7, 2000
|-  style="text-align:center; background:#fbb;"
| 41 || May 19 || @ Mets || 3–4 || Jones || Stottlemyre || Benitez (10) || Shea Stadium || 25,292 || 27–14 || Arizona Diamondbacks at New York Mets Box Score, May 19, 2000
|-  style="text-align:center; background:#fbb;"
| 42 || May 20 || @ Mets || 7–8 || Hampton || Daal || Benitez (11) || Shea Stadium || 37,121 || 27–15 || Arizona Diamondbacks at New York Mets Box Score, May 20, 2000
|-  style="text-align:center; background:#fbb;"
| 43 || May 21 || @ Mets || 6–7 || Wendell || Kim || None || Shea Stadium || 38,826 || 27–16 || Arizona Diamondbacks at New York Mets Box Score, May 21, 2000
|-  style="text-align:center; background:#bfb;"
| 44 || May 23 || Pirates || 6–1 || Anderson || Anderson || None || Bank One Ballpark || 31,726 || 28–16 || Pittsburgh Pirates at Arizona Diamondbacks Box Score, May 23, 2000
|-  style="text-align:center; background:#bfb;"
| 45 || May 24 || Pirates || 6–5 || Stottlemyre || Schmidt || Kim (4) || Bank One Ballpark || 30,462 || 29–16 || Pittsburgh Pirates at Arizona Diamondbacks Box Score, May 24, 2000
|-  style="text-align:center; background:#bfb;"
| 46 || May 25 || Pirates || 1–0 || Daal || Benson || Mantei (1) || Bank One Ballpark || 30,759 || 30–16 || Pittsburgh Pirates at Arizona Diamondbacks Box Score, May 25, 2000
|-  style="text-align:center; background:#bfb;"
| 47 || May 26 || Brewers || 9–2 || Johnson || Snyder || None || Bank One Ballpark || 34,846 || 31–16 || Milwaukee Brewers at Arizona Diamondbacks Box Score, May 26, 2000
|-  style="text-align:center; background:#bfb;"
| 48 || May 27 || Brewers || 7–3 || Reynoso || Acevedo || Kim (5) || Bank One Ballpark || 35,163 || 32–16 || Milwaukee Brewers at Arizona Diamondbacks Box Score, May 27, 2000
|-  style="text-align:center; background:#fbb;"
| 49 || May 28 || Brewers || 3–4 (11 inn.) || Wickman || Swindell || None || Bank One Ballpark || 35,121 || 32–17 || Milwaukee Brewers at Arizona Diamondbacks Box Score, May 28, 2000
|-  style="text-align:center; background:#fbb;"
| 50 || May 29 || Cardinals || 0–3 || Stephenson || Stottlemyre || None || Bank One Ballpark || 47,014 || 32–18 || St. Louis Cardinals at Arizona Diamondbacks Box Score, May 29, 2000
|-  style="text-align:center; background:#fbb;"
| 51 || May 30 || Cardinals || 1–6 || Ankiel || Daal || Morris (1) || Bank One Ballpark || 36,180 || 32–19 || St. Louis Cardinals at Arizona Diamondbacks Box Score, May 30, 2000
|-  style="text-align:center; background:#bfb;"
| 52 || May 31 || Cardinals || 6–2 || Johnson || Hentgen || Kim (6) || Bank One Ballpark || 39,761 || 33–19 || St. Louis Cardinals at Arizona Diamondbacks Box Score, May 31, 2000
|-

|-  style="text-align:center; background:#bfb;"
| 53 || June 1 || Cardinals || 4–0 || Reynoso || Benes || None || Bank One Ballpark || 37,131 || 34–19 || St. Louis Cardinals at Arizona Diamondbacks Box Score, June 1, 2000
|-  style="text-align:center; background:#bfb;"
| 54 || June 2 || @ Rangers || 5–4 || Anderson || Helling || Mantei (2) || The Ballpark in Arlington || 40,770 || 35–19 || Arizona Diamondbacks at Texas Rangers Box Score, June 2, 2000
|-  style="text-align:center; background:#fbb;"
| 55 || June 3 || @ Rangers || 3–4 || Rogers || Figueroa || Wetteland (14) || The Ballpark in Arlington || 46,222 || 35–20 || Arizona Diamondbacks at Texas Rangers Box Score, June 3, 2000
|-  style="text-align:center; background:#fbb;"
| 56 || June 4 || @ Rangers || 6–7 || Perisho || Kim || Wetteland (15) || The Ballpark in Arlington || 46,336 || 35–21 || Arizona Diamondbacks at Texas Rangers Box Score, June 4, 2000
|-  style="text-align:center; background:#fbb;"
| 57 || June 5 || @ Cubs || 3–4 (10 inn.) || Heredia || Mantei || None || Wrigley Field || 32,197 || 35–22 || Arizona Diamondbacks at Chicago Cubs Box Score, June 5, 2000
|-  style="text-align:center; background:#fbb;"
| 58 || June 6 || @ Cubs || 1–4 || Tapani || Reynoso || None || Wrigley Field || 35,933 || 35–23 || Arizona Diamondbacks at Chicago Cubs Box Score, June 6, 2000
|-  style="text-align:center; background:#fbb;"
| 59 || June 7 || @ Cubs || 4–9 || Downs || Anderson || Van Poppel (2) || Wrigley Field || 37,596 || 35–24 || Arizona Diamondbacks at Chicago Cubs Box Score, June 7, 2000
|-  style="text-align:center; background:#bfb;"
| 60 || June 9 || Angels || 4–1 || Johnson || Cooper || Kim (7) || Bank One Ballpark || 39,468 || 36–24 || Anaheim Angels at Arizona Diamondbacks Box Score, June 9, 2000
|-  style="text-align:center; background:#fbb;"
| 61 || June 10 || Angels || 3–10 || Washburn || Daal || None || Bank One Ballpark || 35,213 || 36–25 || Anaheim Angels at Arizona Diamondbacks Box Score, June 10, 2000
|-  style="text-align:center; background:#bfb;"
| 62 || June 11 || Angels || 3–2 || Plesac || Schoeneweis || Kim (8) || Bank One Ballpark || 36,349 || 37–25 || Anaheim Angels at Arizona Diamondbacks Box Score, June 11, 2000
|-  style="text-align:center; background:#bfb;"
| 63 || June 12 || @ Dodgers || 4–2 || Anderson || Dreifort || Kim (9) || Dodger Stadium || 25,552 || 38–25 || Arizona Diamondbacks at Los Angeles Dodgers Box Score, June 12, 2000
|-  style="text-align:center; background:#fbb;"
| 64 || June 13 || @ Dodgers || 1–6 || Park || Morgan || None || Dodger Stadium || 34,067 || 38–26 || Arizona Diamondbacks at Los Angeles Dodgers Box Score, June 13, 2000
|-  style="text-align:center; background:#bfb;"
| 65 || June 14 || @ Dodgers || 5–1 || Johnson || Perez || None || Dodger Stadium || 27,332 || 39–26 || Arizona Diamondbacks at Los Angeles Dodgers Box Score, June 14, 2000
|-  style="text-align:center; background:#fbb;"
| 66 || June 15 || @ Dodgers || 0–4 || Brown || Stottlemyre || None || Dodger Stadium || 30,103 || 39–27 || Arizona Diamondbacks at Los Angeles Dodgers Box Score, June 15, 2000
|-  style="text-align:center; background:#fbb;"
| 67 || June 17 || @ Rockies || 5–14 || Bohanon || Anderson || None || Coors Field || 48,043 || 39–28 || Arizona Diamondbacks at Colorado Rockies Box Score, June 17, 2000
|-  style="text-align:center; background:#fbb;"
| 68 || June 18 || @ Rockies || 2–19 || Yoshi || Reynoso || None || Coors Field || 48,117 || 39–29 || Arizona Diamondbacks at Colorado Rockies Box Score, June 18, 2000
|-  style="text-align:center; background:#bfb;"
| 69 || June 19 || Padres || 3–2 || Padilla || Kolb || None || Bank One Ballpark || 37,336 || 40–29 || San Diego Padres at Arizona Diamondbacks Box Score, June 19, 2000
|-  style="text-align:center; background:#fbb;"
| 70 || June 20 || Padres || 1–3 || Tollberg || Stottlemyre || Hoffman (18) || Bank One Ballpark || 30,011 || 40–30 || San Diego Padres at Arizona Diamondbacks Box Score, June 20, 2000
|-  style="text-align:center; background:#bfb;"
| 71 || June 21 || Padres || 11–8 || Morgan || Reyes || None || Bank One Ballpark || 33,003 || 41–30 || San Diego Padres at Arizona Diamondbacks Box Score, June 19, 2000
|-  style="text-align:center; background:#bfb;"
| 72 || June 23 || Rockies || 2–0 || Anderson || Bohanon || Kim (10) || Bank One Ballpark || 37,089 || 42–30 || Colorado Rockies at Arizona Diamondbacks Box Score, June 23, 2000
|-  style="text-align:center; background:#fbb;"
| 73 || June 24 || Rockies || 0–4 || Yoshii || Johnson || None || Bank One Ballpark || 42,559 || 42–31 || Colorado Rockies at Arizona Diamondbacks Box Score, June 24, 2000
|-  style="text-align:center; background:#bfb;"
| 74 || June 25 || Rockies || 8–3 || Morgan || Astacio || None || Bank One Ballpark || 35,887 || 43–31 || Colorado Rockies at Arizona Diamondbacks Box Score, June 25, 2000
|-  style="text-align:center; background:#bfb;"
| 75 || June 26 || Astros || 6–1 || Reynoso || Dotel || Kim (11) || Bank One Ballpark || 31,338 || 44–31 || Houston Astros at Arizona Diamondbacks Box Score, June 26, 2000
|-  style="text-align:center; background:#fbb;"
| 76 || June 27 || Astros || 4–12 || Elarton || Daal || None || Bank One Ballpark || 30,115 || 44–32 || Houston Astros at Arizona Diamondbacks Box Score, June 27, 2000
|-  style="text-align:center; background:#bfb;"
| 77 || June 28 || Astros || 6–2 || Anderson || Lima || Kim (12) || Bank One Ballpark || 29,540 || 45–32 || Houston Astros at Arizona Diamondbacks Box Score, June 28, 2000
|-  style="text-align:center; background:#bfb;"
| 78 || June 29 || Astros || 7–1 || Johnson || Reynolds || None || Bank One Ballpark || 31,518 || 46–32 || Houston Astros at Arizona Diamondbacks Box Score, June 29, 2000
|-  style="text-align:center; background:#fbb;"
| 79 || June 30 || Reds || 4–5 || Harnisch || Morgan || Graves (12)  || Bank One Ballpark || 38,197 || 46–33 || Cincinnati Reds at Arizona Diamondbacks Box Score, June 30, 2000
|-

|-  style="text-align:center; background:#bfb;"
| 80 || July 1 || Reds || 9–6 || Springer || Fernandez || Kim (13)  || Bank One Ballpark || 39,385 || 47–33 || Cincinnati Reds at Arizona Diamondbacks Box Score, July 1, 2000
|-  style="text-align:center; background:#fbb;"
| 81 || July 2 || Reds || 2–14 || Neagle || Daal || None  || Bank One Ballpark || 39,841 || 47–34 || Cincinnati Reds at Arizona Diamondbacks Box Score, July 2, 2000
|-  style="text-align:center; background:#fbb;"
| 82 || July 3 || Reds || 2–3 || Parris || Anderson || Graves (13)  || Bank One Ballpark || 38,287 || 47–35 || Cincinnati Reds at Arizona Diamondbacks Box Score, July 3, 2000
|-  style="text-align:center; background:#bfb;"
| 83 || July 4 || @ Astros || 10–4 || Johnson || Lima || None || Enron Field || 42,147 || 48–35 || Arizona Diamondbacks at Houston Astros Box Score, July 4, 2000
|-  style="text-align:center; background:#bfb;"
| 84 || July 5 || @ Astros || 12–9 || Morgan || Valdes || Kim (14) || Enron Field || 36,218 || 49–35 || Arizona Diamondbacks at Houston Astros Box Score, July 5, 2000
|-  style="text-align:center; background:#bfb;"
| 85 || July 6 || @ Astros || 2–1 || Guzman || Holt || Mantei (3) || Enron Field || 36,471 || 50–35 || Arizona Diamondbacks at Houston Astros Box Score, July 6, 2000
|-  style="text-align:center; background:#fbb;"
| 86 || July 7 || @ Athletics || 4–5 (11 inn.) || Tam || Daal || None || Network Associates Coliseum || 17,287 || 50–36 || Arizona Diamondbacks at Oakland Athletics Box Score, July 7, 2000
|-  style="text-align:center; background:#fbb;"
| 87 || July 8 || @ Athletics || 7–8 (10 inn.) || Isringhausen || Swindell || None || Network Associates Coliseum || 54,268 || 50–37 || Arizona Diamondbacks at Oakland Athletics Box Score, July 8, 2000
|-  style="text-align:center; background:#bfb;"
| 88 || July 9 || @ Athletics || 4–2 || Johnson || Heredia || Mantei (4) || Network Associates Coliseum || 25,513 || 51–37 || Arizona Diamondbacks at Oakland Athletics Box Score, July 9, 2000
|-  style="text-align:center; background:#fbb;"
| 89 || July 13 || Rangers || 4–6 || Zimmerman || Kim || Wetteland (22) || Bank One Ballpark || 32,541 || 51–38 || Texas Rangers at Arizona Diamondbacks Box Score, July 13, 2000
|-  style="text-align:center; background:#bfb;"
| 90 || July 14 || Rangers || 6–1 || Reynoso || Rogers || None || Bank One Ballpark || 34,415 || 52–38 || Texas Rangers at Arizona Diamondbacks Box Score, July 14, 2000
|-  style="text-align:center; background:#fbb;"
| 91 || July 15 || Rangers || 5–6 (11 inn.) || Zimmerman || Swindell || Wetteland (23) || Bank One Ballpark || 37,856 || 52–39 || Texas Rangers at Arizona Diamondbacks Box Score, July 15, 2000
|-  style="text-align:center; background:#fbb;"
| 92 || July 16 || Mariners || 3–6 || Mesa || Springer || Sasaki (21) || Bank One Ballpark || 34,144 || 52–40 || Seattle Mariners at Arizona Diamondbacks Box Score, July 16, 2000
|-  style="text-align:center; background:#bfb;"
| 93 || July 17 || Mariners || 7–0 || Guzman || Halama || None || Bank One Ballpark || 35,504 || 53–40 || Seattle Mariners at Arizona Diamondbacks Box Score, July 17, 2000
|-  style="text-align:center; background:#fbb;"
| 94 || July 18 || Mariners || 2–5 || Rhodes || Padilla || Sasaki (22) || Bank One Ballpark || 32,090 || 53–41 || Seattle Mariners at Arizona Diamondbacks Box Score, July 18, 2000
|-  style="text-align:center; background:#bfb;"
| 95 || July 19 || Cardinals || 4–3 || Reynoso || Stephenson || Mantei (5) || Bank One Ballpark || 37,119 || 54–41 || St. Louis Cardinals at Arizona Diamondbacks Box Score, July 19, 2000
|-  style="text-align:center; background:#bfb;"
| 96 || July 20 || Cardinals || 3–2 || Johnson || Veres || None || Bank One Ballpark || 40,937 || 55–41 || St. Louis Cardinals at Arizona Diamondbacks Box Score, July 20, 2000
|-  style="text-align:center; background:#bfb;"
| 97 || July 21 || @ Reds || 5–4 || Swindell || Sullivan || Mantei (6) || Cinergy Field || 46,101 || 56–41 || Arizona Diamondbacks at Cincinnati Reds Box Score, July 21, 2000
|-  style="text-align:center; background:#fbb;"
| 98 || July 22 || @ Reds || 3–7 || Villone || Guzman || None || Cinergy Field || 42,568 || 56–42 || Arizona Diamondbacks at Cincinnati Reds Box Score, July 22, 2000
|-  style="text-align:center; background:#fbb;"
| 99 || July 23 || @ Reds || 3–5 || Dessens || Anderson || Graves (17) || Cinergy Field || 34,822 || 56–43 || Arizona Diamondbacks at Cincinnati Reds Box Score, July 23, 2000
|-  style="text-align:center; background:#fbb;"
| 100 || July 25 || @ Cardinals || 3–7 || Stephenson || Johnson || None || Busch Memorial Stadium || 44,454 || 56–44 || Arizona Diamondbacks at St. Louis Cardinals Box Score, July 25, 2000
|-  style="text-align:center; background:#fbb;"
| 101 || July 26 || @ Cardinals || 4–8 || Kile || Reynoso || None || Busch Memorial Stadium || 42,762 || 56–45 || Arizona Diamondbacks at St. Louis Cardinals Box Score, July 26, 2000
|-  style="text-align:center; background:#bfb;"
| 102 || July 27 || @ Cardinals || 17–5 || Guzman || Ankiel || None || Busch Memorial Stadium || 42,963 || 57–45 || Arizona Diamondbacks at St. Louis Cardinals Box Score, July 27, 2000
|-  style="text-align:center; background:#bfb;"
| 103 || July 28 || @ Marlins || 4–1 || Schilling || Cornelius || Mantei (7) || Pro Player Stadium || 12,584 || 58–45 || Arizona Diamondbacks at Florida Marlins Box Score, July 28, 2000
|-  style="text-align:center; background:#fbb;"
| 104 || July 29 || @ Marlins || 2–4 || Miceli || Kim || Alfonseca (30) || Pro Player Stadium || 15,860 || 58–46 || Arizona Diamondbacks at Florida Marlins Box Score, July 29, 2000
|-  style="text-align:center; background:#fbb;"
| 105 || July 30 || @ Marlins || 3–4 || Almanza || Morgan || Alfonseca (31) || Pro Player Stadium || 16,770 || 58–47 || Arizona Diamondbacks at Florida Marlins Box Score, July 30, 2000
|-

|-  style="text-align:center; background:#fbb;"
| 106 || August 1 || Braves || 2–4 || Millwood || Swindell || Remlinger (10) || Bank One Ballpark || 35,138 || 58–48 || Atlanta Braves at Arizona Diamondbacks Box Score, August 1, 2000
|-  style="text-align:center; background:#bfb;"
| 107 || August 2 || Braves || 2–0 || Schilling || Maddux || None || Bank One Ballpark || 40,643 || 59–48 || Atlanta Braves at Arizona Diamondbacks Box Score, August 2, 2000
|-  style="text-align:center; background:#bfb;"
| 108 || August 3 || Braves || 8–4 || Anderson || Ashby || None || Bank One Ballpark || 35,441 || 60–48 || Atlanta Braves at Arizona Diamondbacks Box Score, August 3, 2000
|-  style="text-align:center; background:#fbb;"
| 109 || August 4 || Mets || 1–6 || Reed || Johnson || Cook (2) || Bank One Ballpark || 41,832 || 60–49 || New York Mets at Arizona Diamondbacks Box Score, August 4, 2000
|-  style="text-align:center; background:#fbb;"
| 110 || August 5 || Mets || 2–6 || Jones || Guzman || White (3) || Bank One Ballpark || 41,656 || 60–50 || New York Mets at Arizona Diamondbacks Box Score, August 5, 2000
|-  style="text-align:center; background:#bfb;"
| 111 || August 6 || Mets || 9–5 || Reynoso || Rusch || Mantei (8) || Bank One Ballpark || 39,641 || 61–50 || New York Mets at Arizona Diamondbacks Box Score, August 6, 2000
|-  style="text-align:center; background:#bfb;"
| 112 || August 7 || Expos || 5–2 || Schilling || Moore || None || Bank One Ballpark || 31,526 || 62–50 || Montreal Expos at Arizona Diamondbacks Box Score, August 7, 2000
|-  style="text-align:center; background:#fbb;"
| 113 || August 8 || Expos || 3–9 || Lira || Anderson || None || Bank One Ballpark || 33,113 || 62–51 || Montreal Expos at Arizona Diamondbacks Box Score, August 8, 2000
|-  style="text-align:center; background:#fbb;"
| 114 || August 9 || Expos || 3–4 || Strickland || Guzman || Telford (2) || Bank One Ballpark || 39,641 || 62–52 || Montreal Expos at Arizona Diamondbacks Box Score, August 9, 2000
|-  style="text-align:center; background:#bfb;"
| 115 || August 11 || @ Pirates || 6–1 || Reynoso || Serafini || None || Three Rivers Stadium || 25,281 || 63–52 || Arizona Diamondbacks at Pittsburgh Pirates Box Score, August 11, 2000
|-  style="text-align:center; background:#fbb;"
| 116 || August 12 || @ Pirates || 6–9 || Sauerbeck || Schilling || None || Three Rivers Stadium || 34,101 || 63–53 || Arizona Diamondbacks at Pittsburgh Pirates Box Score, August 12, 2000
|-  style="text-align:center; background:#bfb;"
| 117 || August 13 || @ Pirates || 7–6 || Morgan || Arroyo || Mantei (9) || Three Rivers Stadium || 25,321 || 64–53 || Arizona Diamondbacks at Pittsburgh Pirates Box Score, August 13, 2000
|-  style="text-align:center; background:#bfb;"
| 118 || August 14 || @ Phillies || 4–3 (11 inn.) || Plesac || Brantley || Mantei (10) || Veterans Stadium || 14,083 || 65–53 || Arizona Diamondbacks at Philadelphia Phillies Box Score, August 14, 2000
|-  style="text-align:center; background:#bfb;"
| 119 || August 15 || @ Phillies || 11–6 || Kim || Gomes || None || Veterans Stadium || 16,949 || 66–53 || Arizona Diamondbacks at Philadelphia Phillies Box Score, August 15, 2000
|-  style="text-align:center; background:#bfb;"
| 120 || August 16 || @ Phillies || 5–1 || Reynoso || Chen || None || Veterans Stadium || 23,498 || 67–53 || Arizona Diamondbacks at Philadelphia Phillies Box Score, August 16, 2000
|-  style="text-align:center; background:#bfb;"
| 121 || August 18 || Cubs || 11–2 || Schilling || Quevedo || None || Bank One Ballpark || 44,440 || 68–53 || Chicago Cubs at Arizona Diamondbacks Box Score, August 18, 2000
|-  style="text-align:center; background:#bfb;"
| 122 || August 19 || Cubs || 11–3 || Anderson || Lieber || None || Bank One Ballpark || 47,404 || 69–53 || Chicago Cubs at Arizona Diamondbacks Box Score, August 19, 2000
|-  style="text-align:center; background:#bfb;"
| 123 || August 20 || Cubs || 5–4 || Johnson || Rain || None || Bank One Ballpark || 43,636 || 70–53 || Chicago Cubs at Arizona Diamondbacks Box Score, August 20, 2000
|-  style="text-align:center; background:#fbb;"
| 124 || August 21 || Brewers || 8–16 || Stull || Reynoso || None || Bank One Ballpark || 31,752 || 70–54 || Milwaukee Brewers at Arizona Diamondbacks Box Score, August 21, 2000
|-  style="text-align:center; background:#fbb;"
| 125 || August 22 || Brewers || 3–4 || D'Amico || Guzman || Leskanic (7) || Bank One Ballpark || 31,057 || 70–55 || Milwaukee Brewers at Arizona Diamondbacks Box Score, August 22, 2000
|-  style="text-align:center; background:#fbb;"
| 126 || August 23 || Brewers || 5–8 || Haynes || Schilling || Leskanic (8) || Bank One Ballpark || 29,954 || 70–56 || Milwaukee Brewers at Arizona Diamondbacks Box Score, August 23, 2000
|-  style="text-align:center; background:#fbb;"
| 127 || August 25 || @ Mets || 3–13 || Reed || Johnson || None || Shea Stadium || 38,237 || 70–57 || Arizona Diamondbacks at New York Mets Box Score, August 25, 2000
|-  style="text-align:center; background:#bfb;"
| 128 || August 26 || @ Mets || 5–1 (10 inn.) || Plesac || White || None || Shea Stadium || 43,985 || 71–57 || Arizona Diamondbacks at New York Mets Box Score, August 26, 2000
|-  style="text-align:center; background:#fbb;"
| 129 || August 27 || @ Mets || 1–2 || Hampton || Reynoso || Benitez (35) || Shea Stadium || 42,277 || 71–58 || Arizona Diamondbacks at New York Mets Box Score, August 27, 2000
|-  style="text-align:center; background:#fbb;"
| 130 || August 28 || @ Expos || 5–9 || Thurman || Schilling || Telford (3) || Olympic Stadium || 6,389 || 71–59 || Arizona Diamondbacks at Montreal Expos Box Score, August 28, 2000
|-  style="text-align:center; background:#bfb;"
| 131 || August 29 || @ Expos || 8–7 || Plesac || Forster || Mantei (11) || Olympic Stadium || 6,029 || 72–59 || Arizona Diamondbacks at Montreal Expos Box Score, August 29, 2000
|-  style="text-align:center; background:#bfb;"
| 132 || August 30 || @ Expos || 7–0 || Johnson || Lira || None || Olympic Stadium || 7,650 || 73–59 || Arizona Diamondbacks at Montreal Expos Box Score, August 30, 2000
|-

|-  style="text-align:center; background:#fbb;"
| 133 || September 1 || Marlins || 7–8 (11 inn.) || Darensbourg || Swindell || Alfonseca (38) || Bank One Ballpark || 31,791 || 73–60 || Florida Marlins at Arizona Diamondbacks Box Score, September 1, 2000
|-  style="text-align:center; background:#fbb;"
| 134 || September 2 || Marlins || 1–10 || Dempster || Schilling || None || Bank One Ballpark || 38,422 || 73–61 || Florida Marlins at Arizona Diamondbacks Box Score, September 2, 2000
|-  style="text-align:center; background:#bfb;"
| 135 || September 3 || Marlins || 10–5 || Kim || Burnett || None || Bank One Ballpark || 36,039 || 74–61 || Florida Marlins at Arizona Diamondbacks Box Score, September 3, 2000
|-  style="text-align:center; background:#fbb;"
| 136 || September 5 || @ Braves || 2–5 || Glavine || Johnson || Rocker (19) || Turner Field || 29,722 || 73–62 || Arizona Diamondbacks at Atlanta Braves Box Score, September 5, 2000
|-  style="text-align:center; background:#fbb;"
| 137 || September 6 || @ Braves || 1–7 || Millwood || Reynoso || None || Turner Field || 25,529 || 74–63 || Arizona Diamondbacks at Atlanta Braves Box Score, September 6, 2000
|-  style="text-align:center; background:#fbb;"
| 138 || September 7 || @ Braves || 0–4 || Maddux || Schilling || None || Turner Field || 30,446 || 74–64 || Arizona Diamondbacks at Atlanta Braves Box Score, September 7, 2000
|-  style="text-align:center; background:#bfb;"
| 139 || September 8 || @ Marlins || 2–1 || Kim || Bones || Mantei (12) || Pro Player Stadium || 10,929 || 75–64 || Arizona Diamondbacks at Florida Marlins Box Score, September 8, 2000
|-  style="text-align:center; background:#bfb;"
| 140 || September 9 || @ Marlins || 4–1 || Stottlemyre || Burnett || Mantei (13) || Pro Player Stadium || 16,610 || 76–64 || Arizona Diamondbacks at Florida Marlins Box Score, September 9, 2000
|-  style="text-align:center; background:#fbb;"
| 141 || September 10 || @ Marlins || 3–4 (12 inn.) || Looper || Springer || None || Pro Player Stadium || 13,117 || 76–65 || Arizona Diamondbacks at Florida Marlins Box Score, September 10, 2000
|-  style="text-align:center; background:#fbb;"
| 142 || September 11 || Dodgers || 3–6 || Gagne || Reynoso || None || Bank One Ballpark || 37,589 || 76–66 || Los Angeles Dodgers at Arizona Diamondbacks Box Score, September 11, 2000
|-  style="text-align:center; background:#bfb;"
| 143 || September 12 || Dodgers || 5–4 || Kim || Masaoka || Mantei (14) || Bank One Ballpark || 32,102 || 77–66 || Los Angeles Dodgers at Arizona Diamondbacks Box Score, September 12, 2000
|-  style="text-align:center; background:#bfb;"
| 144 || September 13 || Dodgers || 3–2 || Plesac || Adams || None || Bank One Ballpark || 34,526 || 78–66 || Los Angeles Dodgers at Arizona Diamondbacks Box Score, September 13, 2000
|-  style="text-align:center; background:#bfb;"
| 145 || September 15 || Braves || 2–1 || Johnson || Glavine || Mantei (15) || Bank One Ballpark || 39,774 || 79–66 || Atlanta Braves at Arizona Diamondbacks Box Score, September 15, 2000
|-  style="text-align:center; background:#fbb;"
| 146 || September 16 || Braves || 10–12 || Burkett || Stottlemyre || Rocker (22) || Bank One Ballpark || 41,470 || 79–67 || Atlanta Braves at Arizona Diamondbacks Box Score, September 16, 2000
|-  style="text-align:center; background:#fbb;"
| 147 || September 17 || Braves || 1–7 || Millwood || Schilling || None || Bank One Ballpark || 38,364 || 79–68 || Atlanta Braves at Arizona Diamondbacks Box Score, September 17, 2000
|-  style="text-align:center; background:#fbb;"
| 148 || September 18 || @ Dodgers || 1–7 || Shaw || Swindell || None || Dodger Stadium || 31,345 || 79–69 || Arizona Diamondbacks at Los Angeles Dodgers Box Score, September 18, 2000
|-  style="text-align:center; background:#fbb;"
| 149 || September 19 || @ Dodgers || 1–7 || Park || Anderson || Shaw (26) || Dodger Stadium || 29,753 || 79–70 || Arizona Diamondbacks at Los Angeles Dodgers Box Score, September 19, 2000
|-  style="text-align:center; background:#fbb;"
| 150 || September 20 || @ Dodgers || 1–7 || Herges || Kim || None || Dodger Stadium || 31,630 || 79–71 || Arizona Diamondbacks at Los Angeles Dodgers Box Score, September 20, 2000
|-  style="text-align:center; background:#fbb;"
| 151 || September 21 || @ Giants || 7–8 || Henry || Morgan || Nen (39) || Pacific Bell Park || 40,930 || 79–72 || Arizona Diamondbacks at San Francisco Giants Box Score, September 21, 2000
|-  style="text-align:center; background:#bfb;"
| 152 || September 22 || @ Giants || 7–1 || Schilling || Gardner || None || Pacific Bell Park || 40,930 || 80–72 || Arizona Diamondbacks at San Francisco Giants Box Score, September 22, 2000
|-  style="text-align:center; background:#bfb;"
| 153 || September 23 || @ Giants || 7–5 || Guzman || Estes || Mantei (16) || Pacific Bell Park || 40,930 || 81–72 || Arizona Diamondbacks at San Francisco Giants Box Score, September 23, 2000
|-  style="text-align:center; background:#fbb;"
| 154 || September 23 || @ Giants || 5–9 || Del Toro || Reynoso || None || Pacific Bell Park || 40,930 || 81–73 || Arizona Diamondbacks at San Francisco Giants Box Score, September 23, 2000
|-  style="text-align:center; background:#bfb;"
| 155 || September 24 || @ Giants || 8–3 || Anderson || Hernandez || None || Pacific Bell Park || 40,930 || 82–73 || Arizona Diamondbacks at San Francisco Giants Box Score, September 24, 2000
|-  style="text-align:center; background:#bfb;"
| 156 || September 25 || @ Rockies || 6–4 || Johnson || Rose || Mantei (17) || Coors Field || 37,131 || 83–73 || Arizona Diamondbacks at Colorado Rockies Box Score, September 25, 2000
|-  style="text-align:center; background:#fbb;"
| 157 || September 26 || @ Rockies || 6–7 || Chouinard || Morgan || Jimenez (22) || Coors Field || 35,703 || 83–74 || Arizona Diamondbacks at Colorado Rockies Box Score, September 26, 2000
|-  style="text-align:center; background:#fbb;"
| 158 || September 27 || @ Rockies || 4–6 || White || Plesac || Jimenez (23) || Coors Field || 36,519 || 83–75 || Arizona Diamondbacks at Colorado Rockies Box Score, September 27, 2000
|-  style="text-align:center; background:#bfb;"
| 159 || September 28 || @ Rockies || 12–3 || Reynoso || Wasdin || None || Coors Field || 36,659 || 84–75 || Arizona Diamondbacks at Colorado Rockies Box Score, September 28, 2000
|-  style="text-align:center; background:#fbb;"
| 160 || September 29 || Giants || 3–4 || Hernandez || Anderson || Nen (41) || Bank One Ballpark || 38,435 || 84–76 || San Francisco Giants at Arizona Diamondbacks Box Score, September 29, 2000
|-  style="text-align:center; background:#bfb;"
| 161 || September 30 || Giants || 5–1 || Guzman || Embree || None || Bank One Ballpark || 42,794 || 85–76 || San Francisco Giants at Arizona Diamondbacks Box Score, September 30, 2000
|-

|-  style="text-align:center; background:#fbb;"
| 162 || October 1 || Giants || 4–11 || Ortiz || Johnson || Jimenez (23) || Bank One Ballpark || 41,483 || 85–77 || San Francisco Giants at Arizona Diamondbacks Box Score, October 1, 2000
|-

Roster

Player stats

Batting
Note: Pos = Position; G = Games played; AB = At bats; H = Hits; HR = Home runs; RBI = Runs batted in; Avg. = Batting average

Other batters
Note: G = Games played; AB = At bats; H = Hits; HR = Home runs; RBI = Runs batted in; Avg. = Batting average

Starting pitchers
Note: G = Games pitched; IP = Inning pitched; W = Wins; L = Losses; ERA = Earned run average; SO = Strikeouts

Relief pitchers 
Note: G = Games pitched; IP = Innings pitched; W = Wins; L = Losses; SV = Saves; ERA = Earned run average; SO = Strikeouts

Farm system

References

External links
 Arizona Diamondbacks official web site 
 2000 Arizona Diamondbacks team page at www.baseball-almanac.com

Arizona Diamondbacks Season, 2000
Arizona Diamondbacks seasons
Arizona Diamondbacks